The following highways are numbered 343:

Australia
 - Local Bendigo Highway

Canada
Manitoba Provincial Road 343
 Newfoundland and Labrador Route 343
Prince Edward Island Route 343
 Quebec Route 343
Saskatchewan Highway 343

Japan
 Japan National Route 343

United States
  Connecticut Route 343
  County Road 343 (Levy County, Florida)
  Georgia State Route 343 (former)
  Louisiana Highway 343
  Maryland Route 343
  M-343 (Michigan highway)
 New York:
  New York State Route 343
  County Route 343 (Erie County, New York)
  North Carolina Highway 343
  Ohio State Route 343
  Pennsylvania Route 343
  Puerto Rico Highway 343
  Tennessee State Route 343
 Texas:
  Texas State Highway 343 (former)
  Texas State Highway Loop 343
  Virginia State Route 343
  Wyoming Highway 343